The 1988 African Cup of Champions Clubs Final was a football tie held over two legs in November and December 1988 between Entente de Sétif, and Iwuanyanwu Nationale FC.

Road to the final

First leg

Match details

Second leg

Match details

Notes and references

Notes

References

External links
African Club Competitions 1988 - Rec.Sport.Soccer Statistics Foundation

African Cup of Champions Clubs Finals
1
ES Sétif matches
Heartland F.C. matches